Leopoldo Raimondi (March 2, 1938 in Parma – November 8, 2020) was an Italian professional football player.

He played for 2 seasons (19 games, 1 goal) in the Serie A for U.S. Alessandria Calcio 1912 and A.S. Roma.

References

1938 births
2020 deaths
Italian footballers
Serie A players
Parma Calcio 1913 players
U.S. Alessandria Calcio 1912 players
A.S. Roma players
A.S. Sambenedettese players
Venezia F.C. players
Association football defenders